Numa S. Trivas (1899 – 17 April 1942) was an art historian and collector who became a curator of art at the E. B. Crocker Art Gallery.
He was born in Nicolaef, Russia and studied at the Institute of Art History in Saint Petersburg, finishing his studies at the Ecole du Louvre in Paris and the University of Berlin. He was active from 1926 in Amsterdam, where he worked for the Rothmann gallery, and emigrated before World War II to New York City in 1939, settling in Sacramento, California.

Works
Three Centuries of Landscape Drawing: Exhibition Held in August Through October 1940
The Paintings of Frans Hals, 1941
A Pioneering Collection: Master Drawings from the Crocker, 1940
Two Formulas by Liotard, 1941
Les portraits de J.-E. Liotard par lui-mème, 1936

References 
The Paintings of Frans Hals: Complete Edition by Numa S. Trivas, London, George Allen & Unwin, 1941
Numa S. Trivas in Who's Who in California, 1942-1943

Russian art collectors
American art curators
1899 births
1942 deaths
Writers from Saint Petersburg
Soviet emigrants to the Netherlands
Dutch emigrants to the United States